getmail is a simple mail retrieval agent intended as a replacement for fetchmail, implemented in Python. It can retrieve mail from POP3, IMAP4, and Standard Dial-up POP3 Service servers, with or without SSL.  It supports simple and domain (multidrop) mailboxes, mail filtering via any arbitrary program, and supports a wide variety of mail destination types, including mboxrd, maildir, and external arbitrary mail delivery agents. Unlike fetchmail, getmail's Python foundation makes it nearly immune to buffer overflow security holes. It also has a simpler configuration syntax than fetchmail, but supports fewer authentication protocols. The software can also function as a basic mail delivery agent.

Getmail is free software and is licensed under the GNU General Public License version 2.  It is written and maintained by Charles Cazabon.

The original getmail software requires Python 2, which is no longer supported. A fork named getmail6, which is not from getmail's original author, provides Python 3 support.

See also 

Mail retrieval agent
fetchmail
fdm
OfflineIMAP

References

Bibliography

External links

getmail6 fork

Free email software
Free software programmed in Python
Email clients